Kilmokea is located on Great Island, a small peninsula within the Hook peninsula where the Barrow, Suir and Campile rivers meet, close to the Slieve Coillte, the highest point on the Hook peninsula,  from the town of New Ross in County Wexford, Ireland. It is a former Georgian Rectory, situated on a 6th Century Monastic site. Since 1948 it features a seven acre garden, which has been turned into a garden featuring a wide range of subtropical plants and organic vegetables.

History
According to some sources Kilmokea, or Mileadoc was the spot at which Cessair, the granddaughter of Noah, escaping the flood, made the first incursion or invasion into Ireland in 2242 B.C.

In the 6th Century an early ecclesiastical enclosure was established in the townland of Great Island when it was an actual island. In the 8th Century a church was founded here by Suadbar, hence the reference in the name by a Kil, the Gaelic word for church. It was the church of Mac Aodh (Hugh or Mogue). A remnant of this church is a small High Cross, one of the smallest examples of a High Cross in Ireland. It is only 0.55 metres high and at the crux only 0.31 metres wide.

Garden
The garden was opened to the public in 1998. Laid out in seven acres, the gardens are divided into formal, agricultural and parkland sections, including lakes, archaeological areas of interest and even an Italian pavilion.

References

 
Wexford
Peninsulas of County Wexford